Sparna colombiana is a species of beetle in the family Cerambycidae. It was described by Gilmour in 1950. It is known from Colombia, from which its species epithet is derived.

References

Colobotheini
Beetles described in 1950